Ancylis badiana is a moth of the family Tortricidae. It is found in the Palearctic realm.

The wingspan is 12–16 mm.16–20 mm. The forewing  has a brown dorso-basal blotch, From the apex there is a costal streak chequered brown and cream, edged with black, reaching to a cream cross-line.
 
The moth flies from late April to June and again from July to September in two generations, although this might be dependent on the location.

The larvae feed on Trifolium, Vicia, Lathyrus and Lythrum salicaria.

References

External links 
UK Moths
Lepidoptera of Belgium
Lepiforum.de
Microplepidoptera.nl 

Moths described in 1775
Palearctic Lepidoptera
Tortricidae of Europe
Taxa named by Michael Denis
Taxa named by Ignaz Schiffermüller